Erambu is a village in Sota district, Merauke Regency in South Papua province, Indonesia. Its population is 474.

Climate
Erambu has a tropical monsoon climate (Am) with moderate rainfall from June to October and heavy rainfall from November to May.

References

Villages in South Papua